Route 341 in Newfoundland and Labrador leads from Lewisporte to Laurenceton on the island of Newfoundland. The highway is relatively short and there aren't many communities along the way. The road is notoriously hilly and turny, ending in a large dip into Laurenceton. The highway is the only route for residents of Laurenceton to travel to Lewisporte for work.

Route description

Route 341 begins in Lewisporte an intersection with Route 340 (Road to the Isles). It heads north along the banks of Burnt Bay as Main Street to pass through a business district and some neighbourhoods before entering downtown, where Route 341 makes a sharp left at an intersection Route 342. The highway now travels northwest through inland neighbourhoods as Premier Drive before leaving town and becoming Laurenceton Road. Route 341 passes through Stanhope before heading westward through rural wooded areas along the coastline of the Bay of Exploits for several kilometres. The highway then winds its way through Brown's Arm, where it meets a local road leading to Porterville, before passing through more rural areas to enter Laurenceton, where it has an intersection with a local road leading to neighbouring Burnt Arm. Provincial maintenance ends at the western edge of Laurenceton, with the road continuing short and gravel to Sandy Point.

Major intersections

See also

List of Newfoundland and Labrador highways

References

341